Cnephasitis dryadarcha is a species of moth of the family Tortricidae. It is found in India (Assam, Darjeeling, Sikkim, Bengal), north-eastern Burma and Vietnam.

References

Moths described in 1912
Polyorthini